A Dictionary of Modern English Usage (1926), by Henry Watson Fowler (1858–1933), is a style guide to British English usage, pronunciation, and writing. Covering topics such as plurals and literary technique, distinctions among like words (homonyms and synonyms), and the use of foreign terms, the dictionary became the standard for other style guides to writing in English. Hence, the 1926 first edition remains in print, along with the 1965 second edition, edited by Ernest Gowers, which was reprinted in 1983 and 1987. The 1996 third edition was re-titled as The New Fowler's Modern English Usage, and revised in 2004, was mostly rewritten by Robert W. Burchfield, as a usage dictionary that incorporated corpus linguistics data; and the 2015 fourth edition, revised and re-titled Fowler's Dictionary of Modern English Usage, was edited by Jeremy Butterfield, as a usage dictionary. Informally, readers refer to the style guide and dictionary as Fowler's Modern English Usage, Fowler, and Fowler's.

Linguistic approach
In A Dictionary of Modern English Usage, Henry W. Fowler's general approach encourages a direct, vigorous writing style, and opposes all artificiality, by firmly advising against convoluted sentence construction, the use of foreign words and phrases, and the use of archaisms. He opposed pedantry, and ridiculed artificial grammar rules unwarranted by natural English usage, such as bans on ending a sentence with a preposition, rules on the placement of the word only, and rules distinguishing between which and that. He classified and condemned every cliché, in the course of which he coined and popularised the terms battered ornament, vogue words, and worn-out humour, while defending useful distinctions between words whose meanings were coalescing in practice, thereby guiding the speaker and the writer away from illogical sentence construction, and the misuse of words. In the entries "Pedantic Humour" and "Polysyllabic Humour" Fowler mocked the use of arcane words (archaisms) and the use of unnecessarily long words.

Quotations
Widely and often cited, A Dictionary of Modern English Usage is renowned for its witty passages, such as:

 Didacticism  The speaker who has discovered that Juan and Quixote are not pronounced in Spain as he used to pronounce them as a boy is not content to keep so important a piece of information to  himself; he must have the rest of us call them Hwan and Keehotay; at any rate he will give us the chance of mending our ignorant ways by doing so.
 French Words  Display of superior knowledge is as great a vulgarity as display of superior wealth—greater indeed, inasmuch as knowledge should tend more definitely than wealth towards discretion and good manners.
 Inversion  Writers who observe the poignancy sometimes given by inversion, but fail to observe that 'sometimes' means 'when exclamation is appropriate', adopt inversion as an infallible enlivener;  they aim at freshness and attain frigidity.
 Split infinitive  The English-speaking world may be divided into (1) those who neither know nor care what a split infinitive is; (2) those who do not know, but care very much; (3) those who know and condemn; (4) those who know and approve; and (5) those who know and distinguish. ... Those who neither know nor care are the vast majority, and are a happy folk, to be envied by the minority classes.
 Terribly  It is strange that a people with such a fondness for understatement as the British should have felt the need to keep changing the adverbs by which they hope to convince listeners of the intensity of their feelings.
 Welsh rarebit  Welsh rabbit is amusing and right. Welsh rarebit is stupid and wrong.

Editions

Before writing A Dictionary of Modern English Usage, Henry W. Fowler and his younger brother, Francis George Fowler (1871–1918), wrote and revised The King's English (1906), a grammar and usage guide. Assisted in the research by Francis, who died in 1918 of tuberculosis contracted (1915–16) whilst serving with the British Expeditionary Force in the First World War (1914–1918), Henry dedicated the first edition of the Dictionary to his late brother:

I think of it as it should have been, with its prolixities docked, its dullnesses enlivened, its fads eliminated, its truths multiplied. He had a nimbler wit, a better sense of proportion, and a more open mind, than his twelve-year-older partner; and it is a matter of regret that we had not, at a certain point, arranged our undertakings otherwise than we did. . . . This present book accordingly contains none of his actual writing; but, having been designed in consultation with him, it is the last fruit of a partnership that began in 1903 with our translation of Lucian.

The first edition of A Dictionary of Modern English Usage was published in 1926, and then was reprinted with corrections in 1930, 1937, 1954, and in 2009, with an introduction and commentary by the linguist David Crystal. The second edition, titled Fowler's Modern English Usage, was published in 1965, revised and edited by Ernest Gowers. The third edition, The New Fowler's Modern English Usage, was published in 1996, edited by Robert Burchfield; and in 2004, Burchfield's revision of the 1996 edition was published as Fowler's Modern English Usage. The fourth edition, Fowler's Dictionary of Modern English Usage, was published in 2015, edited by Jeremy Butterfield.

The modernisation of A Dictionary of English Usage (1926) yielded the Pocket Fowler's Modern English Usage (1999), edited by the lexicographer Robert Allen, which is based upon Burchfield's 1996 edition; the modernised edition is a forty per cent abridgement realised with reduced-length entries and the omission of about half the entries of the 1996 edition. A second edition of Allen's "Pocket Fowler" was published in 2008, the content of which the publisher said "harks back to the original 1926 edition".

See also
 Disputes in English grammar
 Elegant variation
 False scent

Similar works
 The Elements of Style, by William Strunk Jr. and E. B. White.
 The Chicago Manual of Style, an American English guide to style and publishing markup.
 The Complete Plain Words, by Sir Ernest Gowers.
 Practical English Usage, by Michael Swan, a grammar for non-native English speakers.
 The Cambridge Guide to English Usage, by Pam Peters.
 Merriam Webster's Dictionary of English Usage.
Garner's Modern English Usage.

Notes

References
 Fowler, Henry; Winchester, Simon (introduction) (2003 reprint). A Dictionary of Modern English Usage (Oxford Language Classics Series). Oxford Press. .
 Nicholson, Margaret (1957). A Dictionary of American-English Usage Based on Fowler's Modern English Usage. Signet, by arrangement with Oxford University Press.

1926 non-fiction books
Style guides for British English